Altaras is a Sephardic Jewish surname. It means 'embroiderer' in Arabic. Notable people with the surname include:

 David ben Solomon Altaras, eighteenth-century Italian rabbi
 Aaron Altaras (born 1995), German actor
 Adriana Altaras (born 1960), Croatian born German actress, theater director and writer
 Jakob Altaras (1918–2001), Croatian-German physician and president of the Jewish community Giessen
 Thea Altaras (1924–2004), Croatian-German architect

See also
 al-Tarās family

Jewish surnames